Abba Gumel is a Professor & The Michael and Eugenia Brin Endowed E-Nnovate Chair in Mathematics at the Department of Mathematics, University of Maryland, College Park. His research, which spans three main areas of applied mathematics (namely, mathematical biology, applied dynamical systems and computational mathematics), is focused on the use of mathematical modeling and rigorous approaches, together with statistical analysis, to gain insight into the dynamics of real-life phenomena arising in the natural and engineering sciences.  The main emphasis of Gumel's work is on the mathematical theory of epidemics – specifically, he uses mathematical theories and methodologies to gain insights into the qualitative behavior of nonlinear dynamical systems arising from the mathematical modelling of phenomena in the natural and engineering sciences, with emphasis on the transmission dynamics and control of emerging and re-emerging human (and other animal) infectious diseases of public health and socio-economic interest.

Biography
Gumel was a Foundation Professor of Mathematics at the School of Mathematical and Statistical Sciences, Arizona State University, before becoming The Michael and Eugenia Brin Endowed E-Nnovate Chair in Mathematics at the Department of Mathematics, University of Maryland, College Park in 2022.

Professor Gumel is an elected Fellow of the American Mathematical Society (AMS), Fellow of Society for Industrial Applied Mathematics, African Academy of Sciences, Nigerian Academy of Science, African Scientific Institute and the ASU-Santa Fe Center of Biosocial Complex Systems.

In 2021, Professor Gumel was chosen to give the AMS Einstein Public Lecture in Mathematics of the American Mathematical Society.  He was named Extraordinary Professor at the Department of Mathematics and Applied Mathematics, University of Pretoria (2015-2023) and Adjunct Professor at the Department of Applied Mathematics, University of Waterloo, Canada.

Gumel has written over 160 peer-reviewed research, numerous book chapters and edited three books.

Books

 Abba B. Gumel.  Mathematics of Continuous and Discrete Dynamical Systems.  Contemporary Mathematics Series, American Mathematical Society. Volume 618 (310 Pages), 2014.
 Abba B. Gumel and Suzanne Lenhart (Eds.). Modeling Paradigms and Analysis of Disease Transmission Models. DIMACS Series in Discrete Mathematics and Theoretical Computer Science.  Volume 75. American Mathematical Society, 2010 (268 Pages).
 Abba B. Gumel (Chief Editor), Carlos-Castillo-Chavez (ed.), Ronald E. Mickens (ed.) and Dominic Clemence (ed.). Mathematical Studies on Human Disease Dynamics: Emerging Paradigms and Challenges.  American Mathematical Society Contemporary Mathematics Series, Volume 410, 2006 (389 Pages).

Promotion of biomedical sciences in Nigeria
In 2014, Professor Gumel became one of eight US-based scientists who signed a memorandum of understanding with seven Nigerian universities aimed at helping them build world-class capacity in biomedical sciences research and pedagogy.

Awards and recognition 
 Named to the 2022 class of Fellows of the American Association for the Advancement of Science, ``For distinguished contributions to mathematical biology, particularly the modeling and analysis of epidemics and other global public health challenges, and to the advancement of mathematics on the African continent"
 Named to the 2023 class of Fellows of the American Mathematical Society, "for contributions to the mathematical theory of epidemics, applied dynamical systems, and promoting the use of mathematics to help solve global public health challenges".
 Named to the 2022 class of Fellows of the Society for Industrial and Applied Mathematics, "for stellar contributions to mathematical biology, particularly the modeling of epidemics, and applications to other public health problems".
 Winner of 2021 Bellman Prize (with former student, Dr. Kamaldeen Okuneye)
 Selected to give The AMS Einstein Public Lecture in Mathematics (American Mathematical Society, March 2021)
 Appointed Founding Fellow, ASU-Santa Fe Institute Center for Biosocial Complex Systems (January 2015)
 Appointed Extraordinary Professor, Department of Mathematics and Applied Mathematics, University of Pretoria, South Africa (2015-2021)
 Merit Award for research excellence in 2011, given by the University of Manitoba and the University of Manitoba Faculty Association (given in May 2012). Eight awards are given each year, under the research category, throughout the campus
 Merit Award for research excellence in 2010, given by the University of Manitoba and the University of Manitoba Faculty Association (given in June 2011)
 Elected Fellow of the Nigerian Academy of Science (FAS): 2010
 Elected Fellow of the African Academy of Sciences (FAAS): 2009
 Received the 2009 Dr. Lindsay E. Nicolle Award for the best paper published in the Canadian Journal of Infectious Diseases and Medical Microbiology

References

Living people
20th-century Canadian mathematicians
21st-century Canadian  mathematicians
Arizona State University faculty
Academic staff of the University of Manitoba
Year of birth missing (living people)
Fellows of the Society for Industrial and Applied Mathematics
Fellows of the American Mathematical Society
Fellows of the African Academy of Sciences